Anna Liza is a Philippine television drama series broadcast by GMA Network. Directed by Gil C. Soriano, it stars Julie Vega in the title role. It premiered on February 4, 1980 as the network's first primetime drama series. The series concluded on May 10, 1985.

Cast and characters
Lead cast
 Julie Vega as Anna Liza Santiago

Supporting cast
 Alicia Alonzo as Isabel Santiago
 Augusto Victa as Lazaro Santiago
 Daria Ramirez as Stella/Adela
 Valen Miranda as Ronnie
 Robert Arevalo as Greg
 Renato del Prado as Guido
 Rey Abellana as PJ
 Digna Kiocho as Cathy
 Leni Santos as Arlene 
 Roderick Paulate as Ricky
 Albert Martinez as Glenn Laxamana
 Suzanne Gonzales as Lilian
 Delia Razon as PJ's mother
 Edgar Mande as Lester
 Alvin Canon as Rocky
 Melissa Mendez as Melissa
 Tony Carrion as Glenn's father
 Gloria Romero as Glenn's mother
 Mitos Canon as Mitos

Recurring cast
 Ester Chavez
 Anita Linda as Munda
 Celia Rodriguez
 Raquel Montesa
 Lina Pusing
 Gloria Ilagan
 Marissa Delgado as Elvie
 Liezl Martinez
 Sugar Benedicto as Sugar
 Manilyn Reynes
 Aiko Melendez
 Bobi Mercado
 Rocco Montalban
 Dina Bonnevie

Production
The series was based on the eponymously popular radio drama series in Cebu in the 1970s which was created by Rey Benedicto and Raynee Salgado. Anna Liza premiered in 1980 under a direction by Gil C. Soriano, and received the attention of thousands of Filipinos—making it one of the most popular and well-loved drama series of all time. It served as a competitor of RPN's Flordeluna, starring Janice de Belen and led to the showbiz rivalry between Vega and de Belen (despite being highlighted as bestfriends offscreen).

The series ended because of Julie Vega's sudden death, resulting in the serial having incomplete storyline and Anna Liza got its TV ratings of 54% by PSRC on its final episode. It was replaced by Mirasol del Cielo.

Remake
In 2013, ABS-CBN remade Anna Liza after the rights of the said drama series was bought from its original director, Gil C. Soriano. Andrea Brillantes played the lead role.

References

External links
 

1980 Philippine television series debuts
1985 Philippine television series endings
Filipino-language television shows
GMA Network drama series
Television shows set in the Philippines